La Teste-de-Buch is a commune in the Gironde department, Nouvelle-Aquitaine, Southwestern France.

It is located on the south shore of Arcachon Bay, lying in the southwestern part of Gironde.

It is the largest of four communes that comprise the Communauté d'agglomération Bassin d'Arcachon Sud (COBAS), which coincides with the urban unit (agglomeration) of La Teste-de-Buch-Arcachon, population 67,563 (2018). It is the eighth-largest commune in metropolitan France in geographical area.

La Teste-de-Buch is famous for the Dune du Pilat, the highest sand dune in Europe. It is also the site of a fictional battle during the Napoleonic wars depicted in Sharpe's Siege by Bernard Cornwell.

Geography
La Teste-de-Buch is located in the department of Gironde, in the middle of the Landes forest, and south of Arcachon Bay. It is the capital of the Pays de Buch. Neighbouring communes are Gujan-Mestras to the east, Arcachon to the northwest, and 
Biscarosse and Sanguinet to the south.

The Dune of Pilat is a famous landmark on the Atlantic coast, situated in the western corner of the commune. The seaside resort of Pyla-sur-Mer, the village of Cazaux, the bird refuge and sandbank of Arguin are also part of the town.

The Étang de Cazaux et de Sanguinet is in the southeast corner, astride the departments of Gironde and Landes. The rest of the commune area consists of old dunes, where the natural forest has changed little over centuries.

During World War I, an airfield was created near Cazaux for airplane pilots training (fighters and bombers). Most of the American volunteers pilots of the Lafayette Escadrille came to the "Camp de Cazaux" to finish their training as war pilots. When the U.S entered the war, the 36th Aero Squadron was based here.

Climate
La Teste-de-Buch features an oceanic climate (Cfb) under the Köppen system, closely bordering on a warm-summer mediterranean climate (Csb) due to the lack of rain in july compared to november, the wettest month of the year. Winters are cool and wet, while summers are hot but bearable. However, cold snaps in winter or heat spikes in summer are rare but not unknown.

Population

International relations
La Teste-de-Buch is twinned with
Binghamton, New York, United States, since 1987.
Schwaigern, Germany, since 2004.

See also
 Arcachon - La Teste-de-Buch Airport
 Pays de Buch
Communes of the Gironde department

References

External links

Official website 

Communes of Gironde